Zabana is an Oceanic language spoken almost exclusively in the Kia district on the northern part of Santa Isabel Island in the Solomon Islands. Zabana is considered a developing language (Expanded Graded Intergenerational Disruption Scale – EGIDS – level 5) which means that the language is in vigorous use, with literature in a standardized form being used by some, though this is not yet widespread or sustainable. It is one of the most spoken languages on Santa Isabel Island, competing with Cheke Holo. There is a 30% to 60% literacy rate in Zabana as a first language and a 25% to 50% literacy rate in Zabana as a second language.

Location 
Zabana is almost exclusively spoken on Santa Isabel Island, which is the largest island in the Isabel provenience and the third largest island in the Solomon Island chain. Zabana is one of the eight different languages spoken on Santa Isabel Island. Out of the other seven different languages spoken on the island, Zabana shares major similarities with Kokota and Cheke Holo (also known as Maringe.) A combination dialect of Zabana and Cheke Holo is also developed and widely spoken within the area.

Phonology 

Zabana only contains open syllables, since there are no consonant clusters and geminate vowels in the language. Vocal stress on a single phoneme does not exist in Zabana; instead, certain syllables called penultimate syllables (the final syllable of a word that ends in a vowel) are stressed. When compared to the neighboring languages, Zabana has fewer phonemes than its neighbors, in particular Kokota.

Morphology  

There are two types of verbs in Zabana, transitive and intransitive verbs.  
 Transitive verb: can be attached with a suffix which indexes the direct or indirect object. 
 Intransitive verb: verbs which convey motion of some sort.  

Words such as 'father', 'mother', and 'uncle' can never take on a possessive suffix.

Larger numbers are made by compounding cardinal numbers, such as one through ten, and the exponential factors of ten, such as one hundred and one thousand.  

Reduplication is used in Zabana to derive intransitive verbs from transitive terms and to derive nouns from verbs.

Sentence structure 
Zabana is a mainly a verb–subject–object (VSO) language.

Declarative 
Declarative sentences are denoted by a drop in intonation at the end of the sentence and the basic sentence structure or word ordering of a declarative sentence is shown below.

Interrogative 
There are four basic types of question sentences in Zabana: polar questions (yes/no), content questions, alternative questions, and dubitative questions (rhetorical). 
 Polar question: denoted by a rise in intonation at the end of a sentence 
 Content question: denoted by the use of one of the four interrogative words and by a fall in intonation at the end of the question
 Alternative question: in Zabana they are usually request or open-ended questions

Honorific language 
There is a chiefly language form of Zabana which is used when addressing clan chiefs.

Complex sentences 
The exception to this rule is the connecting particle , which is used to denote a conditional sentence or question, and  must be used to connect the pronoun and the proper noun together.  can also be used in a complex sentence to link together two different proper nouns.

Conditional sentences 
In Zabana there are two different types of conditional sentences: simple and counterfactual sentences. Both sentences use the particle  to denote that they are conditional sentences.
 Simple conditional: denoted by the use of the particle  along with the particle , simple conditional sentences state a hypothetical situation in Zabana. <blockquote>
Example: 
'If it rains today, the roof will leak.'

 Counterfactual: states a situation where the condition is no fulfilled.<blockquote>
Example: 
'If the boat had come yesterday, I would have gone to Kia.'

External links 
 Paradisec has multiple collection that include Zabana language materials.

References

Languages of the Solomon Islands
Ysabel languages